Brighter Day is the sixth studio album by Australian country musician Troy Cassar-Daley, released on 10 October 2005  and peaked at number 46 on the ARIA Charts.

At the ARIA Music Awards of 2006, the album won the ARIA Award for Best Country Album, this was Cassar-Daley's third ARIA award.

Track listing

Charts

Weekly charts

Year-end charts

Release history

References

2005 albums
Troy Cassar-Daley albums
ARIA Award-winning albums